Richland Township is one of fifteen townships in DeKalb County, Indiana. As of the 2010 census, its population was 1,333 and it contained 509 housing units.

History
Richland Township was organized in 1837.

Geography
Burdick Lake, Depew Lake, Haynes Lake and Lintz Lake are in this township.

Cities and towns
 Corunna

Unincorporated towns
 Sedan

Adjacent townships
 Fairfield Township (north)
 Smithfield Township (northeast)
 Grant Township (east)
 Union Township (east)
 Keyser Township (south)
 Allen Township, Noble County (west)
 Wayne Township, Noble County (northwest)

Major highways
  U.S. Route 6
  Indiana State Road 327

Cemeteries
The township contains two cemeteries: Corunna and Sedan.

References
 United States Census Bureau cartographic boundary files
 U.S. Board on Geographic Names

External links

 Indiana Township Association
 United Township Association of Indiana

Townships in DeKalb County, Indiana
Townships in Indiana
1837 establishments in Indiana
Populated places established in 1837